This is a list of all the United States Supreme Court cases from volume 364 of the United States Reports:

External links

1960 in United States case law
1961 in United States case law